Herzen is a surname. Notable people with the surname include:

 Alexander Herzen (1812–1870), writer
 Édouard Herzen (1877–1936), chemist
 Jana Herzen, singer

See also
 3052 Herzen, asteroid
 Flammende Herzen, 1977 album
 Herzen University
 Starke Herzen, television series